Walk on Water is the ninth studio album (their tenth and final overall) by the British band Katrina and the Waves, released in 1997 (see 1997 in music). The album includes the lead single "Love Shine a Light", the winning song of the Eurovision Song Contest 1997. It also became the band's highest charting UK single, reaching number 3. However, it was not released in the United States as a single.

The track "Eejay" contains a sample of the 1962 song "Something's Got a Hold on Me" by American singer Etta James, who is credited as a co-writer along with the song's other two writers.

Track listing

Personnel
Adapted from the album's liner notes.

Katrina and the Waves
Katrina Leskanich – lead vocals, guitar
Kimberley Rew – guitar, vocals, lead vocals on "The Better You Love" and "Girl With Blue Eyes"
Vince de la Cruz – bass, vocals
Alex Cooper – drums, vocals
Additional musicians
Don Airey – keyboards, string arrangements
Technical
Mike Nocito – producer, mixing
Squid Inc. – design, art direction
Simon Fowler – photography
Strings recorded at Angel Recording Studios, London
Mastered at the Townhouse, London

Charts

References

Katrina and the Waves albums
1997 albums